Kanał Wołczkowski is a canal of Poland, a tributary of the Gunica.

Canals in Poland